Bashirlui, also rendered as Bashirlu, may refer to:
 Bashirlui-ye Olya
 Bashirlui-ye Sofla